Penney Farms is a town in Clay County, Florida, United States. The population was 749 at the 2010 census.

History 
In 1926, department store pioneer J. C. Penney founded the community of Penney Farms. He planned to develop an experimental farming village. The state of Florida incorporated the town in 1927. The real estate decline and stock market crash  caused Penney to scale back his ambitions to a community for retired ministers in honor of his father. Today, the Penney Retirement Community is a  home to Christian laypeople as well as clergy and missionaries.

Geography

State Road 16 leads east  to Green Cove Springs, the county seat, and west  to Starke.

Demographics

As of the census of 2000, there were 580 people, 266 households, and 171 families residing in the town. The racial makeup of the town was 90.86% White, 8.28% African American, 0.17% Asian, and 0.69% from two or more races. Hispanic or Latino of any race were 0.34% of the population.

There were 266 households, out of which 6.0% had children under the age of 18 living with them, 57.5% were married couples living together, 5.3% had a female householder with no husband present, and 35.7% were non-families. 33.5% of all households were made up of individuals, and 28.2% had someone living alone who was 65 years of age or older. The average household size was 1.83 and the average family size was 2.23.

In the town, the population was spread out, with 5.7% under the age of 18, 1.9% from 18 to 24, 6.4% from 25 to 44, 10.2% from 45 to 64, and 75.9% who were 65 years of age or older. The median age was 76 years. For every 100 females, there were 64.8 males. For every 100 females age 18 and over, there were 61.4 males.

The median income for a household in the town was $37,344, and the median income for a family was $46,875. Males had a median income of $31,875 versus $31,250 for females. The per capita income for the town was $23,929. About 8.1% of families and 16.4% of the population were below the poverty line, including 41.7% of those under age 18 and 11.5% of those age 65 or over.

Notable people
Meinhardt Raabe, actor
E. Urner Goodman, Boy Scouts of America

References

External links
 Town of Penney Farms official website
 Archive of previous official town website
 Penney Farms Retirement Community

Towns in Clay County, Florida
Towns in the Jacksonville metropolitan area
Towns in Florida